The Liberal Union (UL) was a small Spanish liberal party founded by Pedro Schwartz in 1983 and officially launched on March 23 of that year.

History
In the 1982 general election, Pedro Schwartz ran as an independent in the lists of the coalition formed by People's Alliance and the People's Democratic Party (AP-PDP), obtaining a bench of deputy by Madrid. He convinced the coalition leader, Manuel Fraga, of the need to create a liberal party with which will dispute the votes of the political center. Fraga acceded and Schwartz created the Liberal Union party that joined the coalition between AP and PDP (with what the coalition was renamed as AP-PDP-UL). The party was registered in the Register of the Ministry of Interior on January 18, 1983.

On January 26, 1984, in an attempt to "renew" the party, Antonio Fontán replaced in the party presidency to Pedro Schwartz. On November 22, 1984, Liberal Union appointed as president of his party to Rafael Márquez, replacing Antonio Fontán.

On December 22, 1984, the Liberal Union agreed to merge with another liberal party that had approached the orbit of the coalition, with the party taking the name of the second: Liberal Party, so that the center-right coalition was renamed AP-PDP-PL (at the time for the 1986 general election it would be named People's Coalition). The merge of both parties was completed in 1985.

Among the Liberal Union members was Esperanza Aguirre.

References

Liberal parties in Spain
Political parties established in 1983
Political parties disestablished in 1984
1983 establishments in Spain
1984 disestablishments in Spain
Defunct political parties in Spain
Defunct liberal political parties